The 1970 Dutch Grand Prix was a Formula One motor race held at Zandvoort on June 21, 1970. It was race 5 of 13 in both the 1970 World Championship of Drivers and the 1970 International Cup for Formula One Manufacturers. This race was held the same day as the 1970 FIFA World Cup Final in Mexico City, Mexico, but that event took place later in the day from this Grand Prix.

The race was won by Lotus-Ford driver Jochen Rindt in his new monocoque-chassis Type 72, a radical wedge shape first used on the 1968 Indianapolis Lotus, with inboard braking and torsion bar suspension, it represented a major technical advance, giving the driver superior ride and vision in a better ventilated seat. Rindt had only raced the car twice before (but in a different spec) and had preferred his old Lotus 49 in the preceding Monaco and Belgian rounds of the World Championship. Three years earlier the 72's predecessor; DFV-debutant Type 49 won in 1967 won first time out at exactly the same track with Jim Clark driving. Rindt racing the 72 without the complex anti-squat and anti-dive features, which the Austrian had never believed in, effortlessly dominated the practice and race putting little pressure on the car and not even having to use the maximum road width or line. The race also saw the debut of Clay Regazzoni with Ferrari, who finished fourth.

Report

Jacky Ickx led Jochen Rindt off the line. On lap 2, Rindt running on full tanks, with 50–55 gallons of petrol on board, put in his fastest lap of the race and outbraked Ickx into the Tarzan hairpin, on the inside in a classic passing manoeuvre, at the start of lap 3. Colin Chapman had persisted with anti-squat and dive on John Miles' Lotus 72 which was fifth on the first lap and proved difficult to pass. This assisted Team Lotus as it was much easier for Rindt to thread past the four car duel for fifth on lap 29–32 than for Ickx or Jackie Stewart who spent 7 laps getting past Jack Brabham, Jean-Pierre Beltoise, John Surtees and Miles Miles in the second 72 was finally being passed by Beltoise on lap 49, when a large wave over the coast dunes saw Miles lose adhesion and Surtees did finally claim the 6th place and the final point by  passing John Miles' Lotus, which was brakeless by then, 4 laps from the flag. However the race was marred by the violent fatal accident of British driver Piers Courage driving the Frank Williams-entered De Tomaso-Ford on lap 22, at Tunnel Oost, when his car's suspension was damaged after hitting a curb, and the car went straight up a grass embankment. It then somersaulted and exploded, and Courage had died instantly after being hit on the head by one of the car's front wheels. The flames were so intense, that trees surrounding the accident site, were lit up as a result. A similar accident occurred at the 1973 race, which claimed the life of Roger Williamson.

Qualifying

Qualifying classification

Race

Classification

Notes
This was the first race for future-grand prix winners Clay Regazzoni, François Cevert and Peter Gethin.
 This was the first win for the Lotus 72.

Championship standings after the race

Drivers' Championship standings

Constructors' Championship standings

Note: Only the top five positions are included for both sets of standings.

References

Dutch Grand Prix
Dutch Grand Prix
1970 in Dutch motorsport
June 1970 sports events in Europe